The 2017 Gran Premio Bruno Beghelli was the 22nd edition of the Gran Premio Bruno Beghelli road cycling one day race. It was held on 1 October 2017 as part of UCI Europe Tour in category 1.HC.

Teams
Twenty-four teams of up to eight riders started the race:

Result

References

2017 UCI Europe Tour
2017 in Italian sport
Gran Premio Bruno Beghelli